The Naths are a tradition within Hinduism.

Nath may also refer to:
 Nath (surname) (including a list of people with the name)
 Nose-jewel, known as nath in some languages of India
 Nath Bank, a former bank of British India

 Sai Nath, a popular guru from India

See also
 El Nath (disambiguation)
 Nath Í (disambiguation), several Irish people with the name